Centrochloa is a genus of Brazilian plants in the grass family. The only known species is Centrochloa singularis, native to the states of Maranhão, Tocantins and Goiás in east-central Brazil. Some authorities consider Centrochloa to be a taxonomic synonym of Axonopus

See also
 List of Poaceae genera

References

Panicoideae
Monotypic Poaceae genera
Endemic flora of Brazil
Grasses of South America